Santolan–Annapolis station (also known as Santolan station) is an elevated Manila Metro Rail Transit (MRT) station situated on Line 3. It is the ninth station for trains headed to North Avenue and the fifth station for trains headed to Taft Avenue.  The station is named after the streets it is located in between—Santolan Road, officially known as Bonny Serrano Avenue, and Annapolis Street. The station is situated near the eastern San Juan-Quezon City boundary.

Nearby landmarks
Its nearest landmarks include Camp Aguinaldo, the Armed Forces of the Philippines and Department of National Defense main headquarters; Camp Crame, the Philippine National Police's main headquarters; V.V. Soliven Building; and AFPLSAI Building (inside Camp Aguinaldo).  It is also the closest station to the Greenhills shopping district and the adjacent Greenhills North and Northeast villages in San Juan, as well as the eastern section of Barangay Wack-Wack Greenhills in Mandaluyong.

Transportation links
Jeepneys, taxis, and buses serve the station. It also has many tricycles near Camp Crame and Camp Aguinaldo serving the nearby smaller streets. A portion of the northbound platform of the station leading to the emergency stairs is utilized as an access point to the EDSA Carousel bus stop located at the center island of EDSA.

See also
List of rail transit stations in Metro Manila
Manila Metro Rail Transit System Line 3

Manila Metro Rail Transit System stations
Railway stations opened in 1999
Buildings and structures in Quezon City
1999 establishments in the Philippines